McVan's To Russia With Love, (born 2 June 2009), also known as Knopa, is a Scottish Terrier show dog, owned by Mariana Khenkina, who won Best in Show at Crufts in 2015. Knopa has gained success at dog shows in several countries and holds Champion titles from Russia, America and a variety of other countries. At Crufts she was handled by Rebecca Cross who has been campaigning her in America. In February she won Best of Breed at Westminster Dog Show in New York City.

Background
Knopa was bred by Vandra Huber and her husband, Michael Krolewski, in the Pacific Northwest of the United States. Born on 2 June 2009, her sire is Land Rose JP All Right, who has the titles of International Champion, Japanese and American Champion; her dam is McVan's Fire Starter, another American Champion. When she was three months old Knopa was exported to Russia to live with her owner Marina Khenkina with a stipulation that Knopa would later return to America to be campaigned in the show ring with the aim of achieving her conformation title in her native land.

Crufts
Knopa was selected as the Terrier Group winner by judge Michael Phillips, having been declared the best Scottish Terrier competing by the breed judge Geoff Corish. On the final day, 8 March 2015, Knopa challenged against the other six group winners. These were a male Flat-Coated Retriever from Sweden, a Maltese who had been brought over from Italy and was also male, a Bearded Collie, an Alaskan Malamute, a Saluki and a female Miniature Poodle from Norway. The judge for Best in show was Ronnie Irving and after choosing Knopa as his overall winner, Irving selected the Flatcoat as Reserve Best in Show. The three judges are all considered terrier experts.
The last time a Scottish Terrier won the Best in Show award at Crufts was in 1929. Knopa's American handler, Rebecca Cross, stated the dog was likely to be retired from competition after this win. Prior to the show Cross had been informed in writing by The Kennel Club that the American style of terrier handling, which includes lifting the dog from the assessment table by grasping the animal by the neck and tail, is not permitted; nevertheless this was the manner used to lift Knopa and Cross later apologised for it.

Show career
The first time Knopa was exhibited at Crufts was in 2013 when she was also declared Best of Breed. On that occasion she was handled by her owner, Khenkina. In February 2015 Knopa was judged to be the best example of her breed at the Westminster Dog Show.

References

External links
 

Best in Show winners of Crufts
2009 animal births